Chernenkovo is a rural locality (a village) in Fominskoye Rural Settlement, Gorokhovetsky District, Vladimir Oblast, Russia. The population was 2 as of 2010.

Geography 
Chernenkovo is located 57 km south of Gorokhovets (the district's administrative centre) by road. Povalikhino is the nearest rural locality.

References 

Rural localities in Gorokhovetsky District